"∞2" (read "Infinity Ni"; translated as "Infinity 2") is Do As Infinity's 23rd single, released on June 16, 2010. The single is the second in the "Infinity" series, after Do As Infinity's 21st single "∞1" (2009). Like "∞1", "∞2" contains four songs with none named after the single itself. Between September 1 and October 31, 2009, the second installment of a contest called Do! Creative!! was held to give Do As Infinity fans a chance to compose songs that the band would later perform. Of the songs received, two were selected to be placed on "∞2": "Everything Will Be All Right" composed by Shohei Ohi, and "Haruka" composed by Fumiyasu Sueoka. A music video was produced for "1/100" directed by A.T. "1/100" and "Everything Will Be All Right" were used as promotional theme songs for professional Kyōtei boat racing in 2010. "Pile Driver" was used as a promotional theme song for Hiroshima University of Economics in 2010.

Track listing

Charts

References

External links
"∞2" at Avex Network
"∞2" at Oricon

2010 singles
Do As Infinity songs
Songs written by Tomiko Van
Song recordings produced by Seiji Kameda
Avex Trax singles